The 1907–08 Scottish Division One season was won by Celtic by four points over nearest rival Falkirk.

League table

Results

References

Scottish Football Archive

1907–08 Scottish Football League
Scottish Division One seasons
Scottish